Thomas Jacco Verheydt (born 24 January 1992) is a Dutch professional footballer who plays as a forward for Eerste Divisie club ADO Den Haag .

Club career

Jodan Boys
Born in The Hague and after youth spells with Wilhelmus, Feyenoord and ADO Den Haag, Verheydt joined Topklasse side Jodan Boys in 2012, making his debut during their 2–1 victory over IJsselmeervogels, in which he scored in the 39th minute. A week later, Verheydt continued his impressive form with a goal during Jodan Boys' 5–3 away triumph against Noordwijk. During October 2012, Verheydt suffered a long-term injury which ruled him out until April 2013. By the end of the 2012–13 campaign, Verheydt had registered fifteen league appearances, netting seven times.

IJsselmeervogels
Following an impressive campaign with Jodan Boys, Verheydt opted to join fellow Topklasse side IJsselmeervogels in July 2013. On 24 August 2013, Verheydt made his debut for IJsselmeervogels in their 0–0 draw against Lisse, replacing Nabil El Gourari in the 56th minute. A month later, Verheydt registered his first goal for the club, during IJsselmeervogels' 1–1 home draw with HHC Hardenberg, netting the hosts' equaliser in the 66th minute. Following his first goal for the club, Verheydt went onto net four more times in the month of October during their victories over Ter Leede and Excelsior Maassluis. On 14 December 2013, Verheydt netted his 10th league goal of the season during IJsselmeervogels' reverse fixture against Lisse.

After an impressive debut season with IJsselmeervogels, netting thirteen league goals in twenty-seven appearances, Verheydt registered his first goal of the 2014–15 campaign, during the club's 2–2 draw with HSV Hoek.

MVV
On 5 August 2015, Verheydt joined Eerste Divisie side MVV, following an impressive record with both Jodan Boys and IJsselmeervogels in the Topklasse. On 6 November 2015, Verheydt scored on his MVV Maastricht debut in their 1–0 victory over Jong Ajax, coming on in the 57th minute for Luca Polizzi and netting in the 90th minute. Following his debut campaign in the Eerste Divisie, Verheydt struggled to adapt and only registered twelve starts all season, netting four times. However, during his second season at MVV Maastricht, Verheydt netted thirteen times in all competitions, including eleven league goals and one each in the KNVB Cup and Eerste Divisie play-offs.

Crawley Town
On 6 July 2017, Verheydt opted to join English club Crawley Town on a three-year deal. On 5 August 2017, Verheydt made his Crawley Town debut during their 3–1 home defeat against Port Vale, featuring for the entire 90 minutes.

Go Ahead Eagles
On 16 July 2018, following a year in England, Verheydt returned to the Netherlands to join Go Ahead Eagles on a two-year deal with the option of an additional year. With Verheydt as their regular striker, Go Ahead Eagles reached the finals of the play-offs for promotion. However, they lost in a shootout against RKC Waalwijk (5–4), who were promoted at the expense of the team from Deventer. He finished the season with 35 appearances in which he scored 13 goals.

Almere City
On 18 July 2019, Almere City announced that Verheydt had joined the club on a two-year contract. He made his debut for the club on 9 August in a 1–1 away draw against Roda JC Kerkrade. His first goal came the following week in a 3–2 home win over Jong PSV. As a second-half substitute, Verheydt headed home a corner to secure the win for Almere City. He scored 10 goals in 15 competitive appearances in his first season at the club and 20 in 39 in his second, the latter of which broke the club's record for most league goals in a season.

ADO Den Haag
On 5 August 2021, it was announced that Verheydt had signed for newly relegated Eerste Divisie club ADO Den Haag on a three-year contract.

Career statistics

References

External links
 

1992 births
Living people
Dutch footballers
Footballers from The Hague
Association football forwards
Feyenoord players
ADO Den Haag players
CVV de Jodan Boys players
IJsselmeervogels players
MVV Maastricht players
Crawley Town F.C. players
Go Ahead Eagles players
Almere City FC players 
Derde Divisie players
Eerste Divisie players
English Football League players
Dutch expatriate footballers
Expatriate footballers in England
Dutch expatriate sportspeople in England